Adil Shukurov (born 16 August 1977) is a retired Azerbaijani football defender, who last managed Zira.

Managerial career
After he had ended his football player's career, he became assistant coach of Azerbaijan U15 national team.

On 2010, he has appointed as a head coach of Azerbaijan U17 to replace Nicolai Adam.

Shukurov worked as a coach in FC Baku youth teams from 2011 until 2015.

On 7 April 2015, Shukurov signed with Azerbaijan Premier League club Zira FK. On 27 December 2016, Shukurov had his contract as manager of Zira terminated by mutual consent.

References

External links
 
 

1977 births
Living people
Azerbaijani footballers
Azerbaijani football managers
Azerbaijani expatriate footballers
Footballers from Baku
Tractor S.C. players
Expatriate footballers in Iran
Association football defenders
Azerbaijan international footballers
Azerbaijan under-21 international footballers